The 5th Annual Premios Juventud (Youth Awards) were broadcast by Univision on July 17, 2008.

Audience
The broadcast attracted an average audience of 5.2 million viewers and was the top-rated program of the evening among adults 18-34, attracting more viewers than all of its English-language competitors, including Are You Smarter Than a 5th Grader?, So You Think You Can Dance, Greatest American Dog, CSI, Swingtown, Last Comic Standing, Fear Itself, Ugly Betty, Grey's Anatomy, and Hopkins.

Presenters & Arrivals
 Adriana Fonseca
 Akwid
 Alacranes Musical
 Alexandra Cheron
 Alexis & Fido
 Alfonso Herrera
 Anahí
 Angel & Khriz
 Aventura
 Black Guayaba
 Belanova
 Chenoa
 Claudio Reyna
 Cristian Chavez
 Christopher Uckermann
 Dulce Maria
 Eduardo Santamarina
 Enrique Iglesias
 Flex
 Fonseca
 Gabriela Vergara
 Gloria Trevi
 Ivy Queen
 Jimena
 Jorge Ramos
 Julian Gil
 Kudai
 Lorna Paz
 Los Tucanes de Tijuana
 Luis Fonsi
 Marlene Favela
 Mayrín Villanueva
 Melissa Marty
 Menudo
 Miguelito
 Olga Tañón
 Omar Chaparro
 Patricia Manterola
 Pee Wee
 Pedro Fernández
 Rafael Mercadante
 RBD
 Scarlet Ortiz
 Thalía
 Tito El Bambino
 Toby Love
 Tommy Torres
 Víctor González
 Wisin & Yandel

Performers
The following is a list of musical artists in order of performance:
 Intro — "Premios Juventud 2008" 01:31
 RBD Performed Y No Puedo Olvidarte 04:52
 Olga Tañón With Tito "El Bambino" Performed En La Disco 03:42
 Enrique Iglesias with Aventura performed "Lloro Por Ti" 04:12
 Los Tucanes de Tijuana performed La Chica Sexy
 Akwid with Los Tucanes de Tijuana performed Ombligo A Ombligo
 Pee Wee, formerly of the Kumbia Kings and Kumbia All Starz performed Life Is A Dance Floor
 Pedro Fernández performed a medley of his biggest hits 11:09
 Luis Fonsi performed No Me Doy Por Vencido
 Thalía performed "Ten Paciencia" 03:29
 Flex performed Te Quiero
 Gloria Trevi performed Cinco Minutos 03:36
 Angel & Khriz performed La Vecina
 Alacranes Musical performed Dame Tu Amor
 Menudo performed Perdido Sin Ti
 Belanova performed "Cada Que..." & "Baila Mi Corazón"
 Fonseca performed Enrédame

Winners and nominees
The following is a list of the nominees and winners (in bold) in the fourteen music-related categories.  The reggaeton duo Wisin & Yandel won four awards.

Music awards

La Combinación Perfecta
 "Soy Igual Que Tú" - Alexis & Fido feat. Toby Love
 "Mochila de Amor" - Miguelito feat. Divino
 "Inalcanzable (Remix)" - RBD feat. Jowell & Randy & De La Ghetto
 "Oye, ¿Dónde Está El Amor?" - Wisin & Yandel feat. Franco De Vita
 "Sexy Movimiento (Remix)" - Wisin & Yandel feat. Nelly Furtado

Que Rico Se Mueve
 Chayanne
 Christopher von Uckermann
 Dulce María
 Ricky Martin
 Shakira

Voz Del Momento
 Aventura
 Camila
 Enrique Iglesias
 RBD
 Wisin & Yandel

Me Muero Sin Ese CD
 El Cartel: The Big Boss - Daddy Yankee
 Empezar Desde Cero - RBD
 La Vida... Es un Ratico - Juanes
 Wisin vs. Yandel: Los Extraterrestres - Wisin & Yandel Todo Cambió (Special Edition) - Camila

Mi Concierto Favorito
 Maná - Amar es Combatir Tour
 RBD - Tour Celestial / Empezar desde Cero World Tour
 Juanes - La Vida Tour
 Daddy Yankee - The Big Boss Tour
 Aventura - K.O.B. TourCanción Corta-Venas
 "¿Dónde Están Corazón?" - Enrique Iglesias
 "Inalcanzable" - RBD
 "Sólo Para Ti" - Camila
 "Te Quiero" - Flex
 "Todo Cambió" - CamilaMi Video Favorito
 "Empezar Desde Cero" - RBD
 "Inalcanzable" - RBD
 "Me Enamora" - Juanes
 "Sexy Movimiento" - Wisin & Yandel
 "Te Quiero" - FlexMi Artista Regional Mexicano
 Alacranes Musical
 Alejandro Fernández Jenni Rivera
 Pepe Aguilar
 Vicente Fernández

Mi Artista Pop
 Belinda
 Camila Enrique Iglesias
 RBD
 Ricky Martin

Mi Artista Tropical
 Aventura Juan Luis Guerra
 Marc Anthony
 Olga Tañón
 Víctor Manuelle

Mi Artista Urbano
 Daddy Yankee
 Don Omar
 Flex
 Ivy Queen
 Wisin & YandelMi Artista Rock
 Alejandra Guzmán
 Belinda
 Black Guayaba
 Juanes
 ManáMi Ringtone
 "Ay Chico (Lengua Afuera)" - Pitbull
 "Impacto" - Daddy Yankee
 "Rompe" - Daddy Yankee
 "Un Beso" - Aventura
 "Yo Te Quiero" - Wisin & YandelFashion and Image awards
Four fashion and image awards were presented (winners in bold).

Quiero Vestir Como Ella
 Alejandra Espinoza
 Anahí
 Dayanara Torres
 Dulce María
 Jennifer LopezEl Del Mejor Estilo
 Alfonso Herrera
 Anthony "Romeo" Santos
 Christopher von Uckermann
 Daddy Yankee
 Ricky Martin¡Está Buenísimo!
 Alfonso Herrera
 Christopher von Uckermann
 Daddy Yankee
 Enrique Iglesias
 Ricky MartinChica Que Me Quita El Sueño
 Alejandra Espinoza
 Anahí
 Dulce María
 Jennifer Lopez Maite Perroni

Movie awards
Three movie awards were presented (winners in bold).

¡Qué Actorazo!
 Antonio Banderas - (Shrek the Third)
 Eduardo Verástegui - (Bella)
 Fernando Colunga - (Ladrón Que Roba Ladrón) Javier Bardem - (Amor en los Tiempos del Cólera & No Country for Old Men)
 Kuno Becker - (Sex and Breakfast)

Actriz Que Se Roba La Pantalla
 Jennifer Lopez - (El Cantante)
 Jessica Alba - (Awake), (Good Luck Chuck), (Los Cuatro Fantásticos), & (The Eye)
 Kate del Castillo - (Trade) Penélope Cruz - (The Good Night)
 Roselyn Sánchez - (The Game Plan)

Película Más Padre
 Amor en los Tiempos del Cólera
 Bella
 El Cantante
 Ladrón Que Roba Ladrón
 Maldeamores

Pop culture awards
Three other pop culture awards were presented (winners in bold).

Mi Ídolo Es...
 Anahí
 Daddy Yankee
 Dulce María
 Juanes
 Ricky Martin

Tórridos Romances
 Aracely Arámbula & Luis Miguel
 Camila Sodi & Diego Luna
 Jackie Guerrido & Don Omar
 Jennifer Lopez & Marc Anthony
 Kate del Castillo & Aarón Díaz

En La Mira Del Paparazzi
 Jennifer Lopez
 Jennifer Lopez & Marc Anthony
 Luis Miguel
 Niurka Marcos
 RBD

Sports awards 
Four sports awards were presented (winners in bold).

El Deportista De Alto Voltaje
 Alex Rodríguez - (New York Yankees)
 Cuauhtémoc Blanco - (Chicago Fire)
 Guillermo Ochoa - (Club América)
 Omar Bravo - (Club Deportivo Guadalajara)
 Rafael Márquez - (FC Barcelona)

La Deportista De Alta Tensión
 Ana Guevara - (Athletics)
 Lorena Ochoa - (Mexican Golfer)
 Maribel Domínguez - (Female Soccer Player)
 Milka Duno - (Female Race car driver)
 Sofía Mulánovich - (Peruvian Surfer)

Me Pongo La Camiseta De...
 Cruz Azul
 Club América
 Club Deportivo Guadalajara
 New York Yankees
 Mexico National Football Team

La Nueva Promesa
 Alexandre Pato - (A.C. Milan)
 César Villaluz - (Cruz Azul)
 Luis Ernesto Michel - (Club Deportivo Guadalajara)
 Sergio Ávila - (Club Deportivo Guadalajara)
 Robinson Canó - (New York Yankees)

References

External links 
Premios Juventud[ Premios Juventud ]
 Premios Juventud Official Site  

2008 music awards
2008 film awards
2008 Premios Juventud
2008 Premios Juventud
2008 in Florida
2008 in sports
2000s in Miami